The lens,  or crystalline lens, is a transparent biconvex structure in most land vertebrate eyes. Along with the cornea, aqueous and vitreous humours it refracts light, focusing it onto the retina. In many land animals the shape of the lens can be altered, effectively changing the focal length of the eye, enabling them to focus on objects at various distances. This adjustment of the lens is known as accommodation (see also below). In many fully aquatic vertebrates such as fish other methods of accommodation are used such as changing the lens's position relative to the retina rather than changing lens shape.  Accommodation is analogous to the focusing of a photographic camera via changing its lenses. In land vertebrates the lens is flatter on its anterior side than on its posterior side while fish the lens is often close to spherical.

Accommodation in humans is well studied to allow artificial means of supplementing our focus such as glasses for correction of sight as we age. The refractive power of a younger human lens in its natural environment is approximately 18 dioptres, roughly one-third of the eye's total power of about 60 dioptres at infancy and 10 dioptres by the age of 25 years. Most of the reduction in our natural accommodation as we age is attributed to the aging of our lenses.

Structure

Position in the eye
The lens is located towards the front part of the vertebrate eye called the anterior segment which includes the cornea and iris positioned in front of the lens. The lens is held in place by the suspensory ligaments (Zonule of Zinn), attaching the lens at its equator to the rest of the eye through the ciliary body. Behind the lens is the jelly like vitreous body which helps helps hold the lens in place. At the front of the lens is the liquid aqueous humor which bathes the lens with nutrients and other things. Land vertebrate lenses usually have an ellipsoid, biconvex shape. The front surface is less curved than the back. A human adult the lens is typically about 10mm in diameter and 4mm thick though changes shape with accommodation and size due to grow throughout a person's lifetime.

Anatomy
The lens has three main parts: the lens capsule, the lens epithelium, and the lens fibers. The lens capsule is a relatively thick basement membrane forming the outermost layer of the lens. Inside the capsule much thinner lens fibers form the bulk of the lens. The cells of the lens epithelium form a thin layer between the lens capsule and the outermost layer of lens fibers at the front of the lens but not the back. The lens itself lacks nerves, blood vessels, or connective tissue.

Lens capsule

The lens capsule is a smooth, transparent basement membrane that completely surrounds the lens. The capsule is elastic and its main structural component is collagen. It is synthesized by the lens epithelium and its main components in order of abundance are heparan sulfate proteoglycan (sulfated glycosaminoglycans (GAGs)), entactin, type IV collagen, laminin. The capsule is very elastic and so allows the lens to assume a more spherical shape when not under the tension of the suspensory ligaments. The human capsule varies from 2 to 28 micrometres in thickness, being thickest near the equator (peri-equatorial region) and thinnest near the posterior pole. 
The photo from an electron microscope shows an specialist area of the capsule near the equator where one of the thousands of suspensory ligaments attach. The attachment must be strong enough to stop the ligament being detached from the lens capsule. Forces are generated from holding the lens in place and added to when focusing. The anterior and posterior capsule is thinner with no similar structures that could scatter light in the visual path.

Lens epithelium
The lens epithelium is a single layer of cells at the front of the lens between the lens capsule and the lens fibers. By providing the lens fibers with nutrients and removing waste the cells of the  epithelium regulate maintain lens homeostasis. As ions, nutrients, and liquid enter the lens from the aqueous humor, Na+/K+-ATPase pumps in the lens epithelial cells pump ions out of the lens to maintain appropriate lens osmotic concentration and volume, with equatorially positioned lens epithelium cells contributing most to this current. The activity of the Na+/K+-ATPases keeps water and current flowing through the lens from the poles and exiting through the equatorial regions.

The cells of the lens epithelium also divide into new lens fibers at the lens equator. The lens lays down fibers from when it first forms in embryo until death.

Lens fibers

The lens fibers form the bulk of the lens. They are long, thin, transparent cells, firmly packed, with diameters typically 4–7 micrometres and lengths of up to 12mm long in humans. The lens fibers stretch lengthwise from the posterior to the anterior poles and, when cut horizontally, are arranged in concentric layers rather like the layers of an onion. If cut along the equator, it appears as a honeycomb. The middle of each fiber lies on the equator. These tightly packed layers of lens fibers are referred to as laminae. The lens fiber cytoplasms are linked together via gap junctions, intercellular bridges and interdigitations of the cells that resemble "ball and socket" forms.

The lens is split into regions depending on the age of the lens fibers of a particular layer. Moving outwards from the central, oldest layer, the lens is split into an embryonic nucleus, the fetal nucleus, the adult nucleus, the inner and outer cortex. New lens fibers, generated from the lens epithelium, are added to the outer cortex. Mature lens fibers have no organelles or nuclei.

Cell fusion, voids and vacuoles
With the advent of other ways of looking at cellular structures of lenses while still in the living animal it became apparent that regions of fiber cells, at least at the lens anterior, contain large voids and vacuoles. These are speculated to be involved in lens transport systems linking the surface of the lens to deeper regions. Very similar looking structures also indicate cell fusion in the lens. The cell fusion is shown by micro-injection to form a stratified syncytium in whole lens cultures.

Development 
Development of the vertebrate lens begins when the human embryo is about 4mm long. The accompanying picture shows the process in a more easily studied chicken embryo. Unlike the rest of the eye which is derived mostly from the inner embryo layers, the lens is derived from the  skin around the embryo. The first stage of lens formation takes place when  a sphere of cells formed by budding of the inner embryo layers comes close to the embyro's outer skin.  The sphere of cells induces nearby outer skin to start changing into the lens placode. The lens placode is the first stage of transformation of a patch of skin into the lens. At this early stage, the lens placode is a single layer of cells.

As development progresses, the lens placode begins to deepen and bow inwards. As the placode continues to deepen, the opening to the surface ectoderm constricts and the lens cells bud off from the embryo's skin to form a sphere of cells known as the "lens vesicle". When the embryo is about 10mm long the lens vesicle has completely separated from the skin of the embryo.

The embryo then sends signals from the developing retina, inducing the cells closest to the posterior end of the lens vesicle to elongate toward the anterior end of the vesicle.  These signals also induce the synthesis of proteins called crystallins. As the name suggests the crystallins can form a clear highly refractive jelly. These elongating cells eventually fill in the center of the vesicle with cells, that are long and thin like a strand of hair, called fibers. These primary fibers become the nucleus in the mature lens. The epithelial cells that don't form into fibers nearest the lens front give rise to the lens epithelium.

Additional fibers are derived from lens epithelial cells located at the lens equator. These cells lengthen towards the front and back wrapping around fibers already laid down. The new fibers need to be longer to cover earlier fibers but as the lens gets larger the ends of the newer fibers no longer reach as far towards the front and back of the lens. The lens fibers that do not reach the poles form tight, interdigitating seams with neighboring fibers. These seams being less crystalline then the bulk of the lens are more visible and are termed "sutures". The suture patterns become more complex as more layers of lens fibers are added to the outer portion of the lens.

The lens continues to grow after birth, with the new secondary fibers being added as outer layers. New lens fibers are generated from the equatorial cells of the lens epithelium, in a region referred to as the "germinative zone" and "bow region". The lens epithelial cells elongate, lose contact with the capsule and epithelium at the back and front of the lens, synthesize crystallin, and then finally lose their nuclei (enucleate) as they become mature lens fibers. In humans, as the lens grows by laying down more fibers through to early adulthood, the lens becomes more ellipsoid in shape. After about age 20 the lens grows rounder again and the iris is very important for this development.

Several proteins control the embryonic development of the lens though PAX6 is considered the master regulator gene of this organ. Other effectors of proper lens development include the Wnt signaling components BCL9 and Pygo2. The whole process of differentiation of the epithelial cells into crystallin filled fiber cells without organelles occurs within the confines of the lens capsule. Older cells cannot be shed and are instead internalized towards the center of the lens. This process results in a complete temporally layered record of the differentiation process from the start at the lens surface to the end at the lens center. The lens is therefore valuable to scientists studying the process of cell differentiation.

Variations in lens structure
In many aquatic vertebrates, the lens is considerably thicker, almost spherical, to increase the refraction. This difference compensates for the smaller angle of refraction between the eye's cornea and the watery medium, as they have similar refractive indices. The fiber cells of fish are generally considerably thinner than those of land vertebrates and it appears crystalin proteins are transported to the organelle free cells at the lens exterior to the inner cells through many layers of cells. Species that need to see well above and below water such as diving birds have the ability to change focus by 50 to 80  dioptres and have a somewhat altered lens and cornea structure and focus mechanisms to allow this. Even among terrestrial animals the lens of primates such as humans is unusually flat going some way to explain why our vision is rather blurry under water.

Function

Focusing

In humans the widely quoted Helmholtz mechanism of focusing, also called accommodation, is often often referred to as a "model". Direct experimental proof of any lens model is necessarily difficult as the vertebrate lens is transparent and only functions well in the living animals. When considering all vertebrates aspects of all models may play varying roles in lens focus.

The shape changing lens of many land based vertebrates

External forces
The model of a shape changing lens of humans was proposed by Young in a lecture on the 27th Nov 1800. Others such as Helmholtz and Huxley refined the model in the mid 1800's explaining how the ciliary muscle contracts rounding the lens to focus near and this model was popularized by Helmholtz in 1909. The model may be summarized like this. Normally the lens is held under tension by its suspending ligaments being pulled tight by the pressure of the eyeball. At short focal distance the ciliary muscle contracts relieving some of the tension, allowing the lens to elastically round up  a bit, increasing refractive power. Changing focus to an object at a greater distance requires a thinner less curved lens. This is achieved by relaxing some of the sphincter like ciliary muscles. While not referenced this presumably allows the pressure in the eyeball to again expand it outwards, pulling harder on the lens making it less curved and thinner, so increasing the focal distance. There is a problem with the Helmholtz model in that despite mathematical models being tried none has come close enough to working using only the Helmholtz mechanisms.
Schachar has proposed a model for land based vertebrates that was not well received. The theory allows mathematical modeling to more accurately reflect the way the lens focuses while also taking into account the complexities in the suspensory ligaments and the presence of radial as well as circular muscles in the ciliary body. In this model the ligaments may pull to varying degrees on the lens at the equator using the radial muscles while the ligaments offset from the equator to the front and back are relaxed to varying degrees by contracting the circular muscles. These multiple actions operating on the elastic lens allows it to change lens shape at the front more subtly. Not only changing focus, but also correcting for lens aberrations that might otherwise result from the changing shape while better fitting mathematical modeling.

The "catenary" model of lens focus proposed by Coleman demands less tension on the ligaments suspending the lens. Rather than the lens as a whole being stretched thinner for distance vision and allowed to relax for near focus, contraction of the circular ciliary muscles results in the lens having less hydrostatic pressure against its front. The lens front can then reform its shape between the suspensory ligaments in a similar way to a slack chain hanging between two poles might change it's curve when the poles are moved closer together. This model requires fluid movement of the lens front only rather than trying to change the shape of the lens as a whole.

Internal forces
When Thomas Young proposed the changing of the human lens's shape as the mechanism for focal accommodation in 1801 he thought the lens may be a muscle capable of contraction. This type of model is termed intracapsular accommodation as it relies on activity within the lens. In a 1911 Nobel lecture Allvar Gullstrand spoke on "How I found the intracapsular mechanism of accommodation" and this aspect of lens focusing continues to be investigated. Young spent time searching for the nerves that could stimulate the lens to contract without success. Since that time it has become clear the lens is not a simple muscle stimulated by a nerve so the 1909 Helmholtz model took precedence. Pre-twentieth century investigators did not have the benefit of many later discoveries and techniques. Membrane proteins such as aquaporins which allow water to flow into and out of cells are the most abundant membrane protein in the lens. Connexins which allow electrical coupling of cells are also prevalent. Electron microscopy and immunofluorescent microscopy show fiber cells to be highly variable in structure and composition. Magnetic resonance imaging confirms a layering in the lens that may allow for different refractive plans within it. The refractive index of human lens varies from approximately 1.406 in the central layers down to 1.386 in less dense layers of the lens. This index gradient enhances the optical power of the lens. As more is learned about mammalian lens structure from in situ Scheimpflug photography, MRI and physiological investigations it is becoming apparent the lens itself is not responding entirely passively to the surrounding ciliary muscle but may be able to change its overall refractive index through mechanisms involving water dynamics in the lens still to be clarified. The accompanying micrograph shows wrinkled fibers from a relaxed sheep lens after it is removed from the animal indicating shortening of the lens fibers during near focus accommodation. The age related changes in the human lens may also be related to changes in the water dynamics in the lens.

Lenses of birds, reptiles, amphibians, fish and others
In reptiles and birds, the ciliary body which supports the lens via suspensory ligaments also touches the lens with a number of pads on its inner surface. These pads compress and release the lens to modify its shape while focusing on objects at different distances; the suspensory ligaments usually perform this function in mammals. With vision in fish and amphibians, the lens is fixed in shape, and focusing is instead achieved by moving the lens forwards or backwards within the eye using a muscle called the retractor lentus.

In cartilaginous fish, the suspensory ligaments are replaced by a membrane, including a small muscle at the underside of the lens. This muscle pulls the lens forward from its relaxed position when focusing on nearby objects. In teleosts, by contrast, a muscle projects from a vascular structure in the floor of the eye, called the falciform process, and serves to pull the lens backwards from the relaxed position to focus on distant objects. While amphibians move the lens forward, as do cartilaginous fish, the muscles involved are not similar  in either type of animal. In frogs, there are two muscles, one above and one below the lens, while other amphibians have only the lower muscle.

In the simplest vertebrates, the lampreys and hagfish, the lens is not attached to the outer surface of the eyeball at all. There is no aqueous humor in these fish, and the vitreous body simply presses the lens against the surface of the cornea. To focus its eyes, a lamprey flattens the cornea using muscles outside of the eye and pushes the lens backwards.

While not vertebrate, brief mention is made here of the convergent evolution of vertebrate and molluscan eyes. The most complex molluscan eyes have superficially similar structure and function to a vertebrate eye, including accommodation, while differing in basic ways such as having a two part lens and no cornea. The fundamental requirements of optics must be filled by all eyes with lenses using the tissues at their disposal so superficially eyes all tend to look similar. It is the way optical requirements are met using different cell types and structural mechanisms that varies among animals.

Crystallins and transparency 
Crystallins are water-soluble proteins that compose over 90% of the protein within the lens. The three main crystallin types found in the human eye are α-, β-, and γ-crystallins. Crystallins tend to form soluble, high-molecular weight aggregates that pack tightly in lens fibers, thus increasing the index of refraction of the lens while maintaining its transparency. β and γ crystallins are found primarily in the lens, while subunits of α -crystallin have been isolated from other parts of the eye and the body. α-crystallin proteins belong to a larger superfamily of molecular chaperone proteins, and so it is believed that the crystallin proteins were evolutionarily recruited from chaperone proteins for optical purposes. The chaperone functions of α-crystallin may also help maintain the lens proteins, which must last a human for their entire lifetime.

Another important factor in maintaining the transparency of the lens is the absence of light-scattering organelles such as the nucleus, endoplasmic reticulum, and mitochondria within the mature lens fibers. Lens fibers also have a very extensive cytoskeleton that maintains the precise shape and packing of the lens fibers; disruptions/mutations in certain cytoskeletal elements can lead to the loss of transparency.

The lens blocks most ultraviolet light in the wavelength range of 300–400 nm; shorter wavelengths are blocked by the cornea.  The pigment responsible for blocking the light is 3-hydroxykynurenine glucoside, a product of tryptophan catabolism in the lens epithelium.  High intensity ultraviolet light can harm the retina, and artificial intraocular lenses are therefore manufactured to also block ultraviolet light. People lacking a lens (a condition known as aphakia) perceive ultraviolet light as whitish blue or whitish-violet.

Nourishment 
The lens is metabolically active and requires nourishment in order to maintain its growth and transparency. Compared to other tissues in the eye, however, the lens has considerably lower energy demands.

By nine weeks into human development, the lens is surrounded and nourished by a net of vessels, the tunica vasculosa lentis, which is derived from the hyaloid artery.  Beginning in the fourth month of development, the hyaloid artery and its related vasculature begin to atrophy and completely disappear by birth.  In the postnatal eye, Cloquet's canal marks the former location of the hyaloid artery.

After regression of the hyaloid artery, the lens receives all its nourishment from the aqueous humor. Nutrients diffuse in and waste diffuses out through a constant flow of fluid from the anterior/posterior poles of the lens and out of the equatorial regions, a dynamic that is maintained by the Na+/K+-ATPase pumps located in the equatorially positioned cells of the lens epithelium. The interaction of these pumps with water channels into cells called aquaporins, molecules less than 100 daltons in size among cells via gap junctions, and calcium using transporters/regulators (TRPV channels) resulting in a flow of nutrients throughout the lens.

Glucose is the primary energy source for the lens. As mature lens fibers do not have mitochondria, approximately 80% of the glucose is metabolized via anaerobic metabolism.  The remaining fraction of glucose is shunted primarily down the pentose phosphate pathway. The lack of aerobic respiration means that the lens consumes very little oxygen as well.

Clinical significance
Cataracts are opacities of the lens. While some are small and do not require any treatment, others may be large enough to block light and obstruct vision. Cataracts usually develop as the aging lens becomes more and more opaque, but cataracts can also form congenitally or after injury to the lens. Nuclear sclerosis is a type of age-related cataract. Diabetes is another risk factor for cataract. Cataract surgery involves the removal of the lens and insertion of an artificial intraocular lens.
Presbyopia is the age-related loss of accommodation, which is marked by the inability of the eye to focus on nearby objects. The exact mechanism is still unknown, but age-related changes in the hardness, shape, and size of the lens have all been linked to the condition.
Ectopia lentis is the displacement of the lens from its normal position.
Aphakia is the absence of the lens from the eye. Aphakia can be the result of surgery or injury, or it can be congenital.

Additional images

See also

Accommodation reflex
Crystallin
Evolution of the eye, for how the lens evolved
Intraocular lenses
Iris
Lens capsule
Phacoemulsification
Visual perception
Zonules of Zinn

References

External links
 

Human eye anatomy
Lenses